Tree jasmine is a common name for several plants and may refer to:
Millingtonia
Radermachera ignea